Jan van Leeuwen (born December 17, 1946, in Waddinxveen) is a Dutch computer scientist and Emeritus professor of computer science at the Department of Information and Computing Sciences at Utrecht University.

Education and career
Van Leeuwen completed his undergraduate studies in mathematics at Utrecht University in 1967 and received a PhD in mathematics in 1972 from the same institution under the supervision of Dirk van Dalen. After postdoctoral studies at the University of California, Berkeley and faculty positions at SUNY at Buffalo and the Pennsylvania State University, he returned to Utrecht as a faculty member in 1977. He was head of his department from 1977 to 1983, and again from 1991 to 1994, and dean from 1994 to 2009. Jan van Leeuwen was one of the founders of Informatics Europe.

Research
Jan van Leeuwen contributed to many fields of theoretical computer science, notably to algorithm design and computational complexity theory, and to the philosophy of computing. Among his doctoral students are algorithms researcher and Utrecht faculty member Hans Bodlaender and notable game software developer and former fellow Utrecht faculty member, Mark Overmars. Van Leeuwen is well known as a former series editor of the Lecture Notes in Computer Science.

Awards and honors
Van Leeuwen is a member of the Royal Dutch Society of Sciences and Humanities since 1992, and in 2006 he was elected to the Academia Europaea. In 2008 he received an honorary doctorate from the RWTH Aachen. In 2013 he received the ACM Distinguished Service Award, together with Gerhard Goos and Juris Hartmanis.

Books

Jan van Leeuwen was the editor of the 2-volume Handbook of Theoretical Computer Science. In 2013, he and S. Barry Cooper published Alan Turing: His Work and Impact (Elsevier), a special edition of the collected works of Alan Turing. This book won the R.R. Hawkins Award 2013.

Family
His son, Erik Jan van Leeuwen, is also an academic computer scientist. He was a senior researcher at the Max-Planck-Institut für Informatik, and currently is an assistant professor and research scientist in the Department of Information and Computing Sciences at Utrecht University.

References

External links 
 Home page
 
 

1946 births
Living people
Dutch computer scientists
Theoretical computer scientists
Researchers in geometric algorithms
Utrecht University alumni
University at Buffalo faculty
Pennsylvania State University faculty
Academic staff of Utrecht University
Members of Academia Europaea
Officers of the Order of Orange-Nassau
People from Waddinxveen